Lewis Ernest Fiander (12 January 1938 – 24 May 2016) was an Australian film, stage, and television actor.

Biography 
Fiander was born in Melbourne to Mona Jane (née King) and Walter Lewis Fiander, and educated at Trinity Grammar School, Kew. Moving to the UK from his native Australia, initially to appear in the play The One Day of the Year, Fiander appeared in such films as I Start Counting (1970), Dr. Jekyll and Sister Hyde (1971), Dr. Phibes Rises Again (1972), The Abdication (1974), Who Can Kill a Child? (1976), Not Now, Comrade (1976), Sweeney 2 (1978), The Doctor and the Devils (1985), Georgia (1988) and Paperback Romance (1994). His first major role on television was Mr. Darcy in the BBC's first colour adaptation of Pride and Prejudice (1967).

In 1970, Fiander originated the role of John Adams in the London stage production of 1776, a role he reprised in Australia. Other stage appearances in West End musicals included the roles of Lord Melbourne and Disraeli in I and Albert, Coward in Noel and Gertie and Puccini in Cafe Puccini. During the 1970s, he was cast as Professor Tryst in the Doctor Who episode "Nightmare of Eden" and after discussion with his friend Tom Baker chose to give the character a hybrid accent as would befit an alien in the future. In 1974, he appeared as Casimir Dudevant playing opposite Rosemary Harris in the BBC series Notorious Woman and performed the role of Thomas Becket on a cast-album of the musical Thomas and The King.

On radio, he played the eponymous lead role in the comedy series Patterson.

He returned to Australia in the early 1980s and continued his acting career.

In 2004 he contributed the voice for airship engineer Kemp in Anthony Lucas's Oscar nominated animation, The Mysterious Geographic Explorations of Jasper Morello.

Lewis Fiander's last known film appearance was in the Don Percy short film Two Moments in Time. Lewis' scenes were shot in late September 2015,
the film was completed in 2017, and premiered at the St. Kilda Film Festival in 2018.

Fiander died on 24 May 2016.

Filmography

References

External links
 
 
 Lewis Fiander at Austage
 Lewis Fiander Image Search
 Obituary

1938 births
2016 deaths
Male actors from Melbourne
Australian male film actors
Australian male stage actors
Australian male television actors